Resonance is the fourth full-length studio album by Polish grindcore band Antigama. It was released on 15 May 2007 by Relapse Records.

Overview
Resonance was recorded in December 2006 at Studio X in Olsztyn, Poland, with producer Szymon Czech. The album was released on 15 May 2007 in the US and 21 May internationally. Antigama hosted a record release show in their hometown on 17 June 2007 at the Aurora Club, in support of the album.

Track listing
 "Pursuit" – 1:16
 "Seismic Report" – 0:59
 "Ecstasy" – 1:21
 "Neutral Balance" – 1:13
 "Order" – 2:16
 "Pending" – 1:57
 "Remembering Nothing" – 1:17
 "Barbapapex" – 2:29
 "Psychonaut" – 3:57
 "No" – 1:34
 "After" – 1:46
 "By and By" – 2:30
 "Shymrok" – 0:53
 "Types of Waste" – 1:44
 "Asylum" – 1:45
 "Unreachable" – 1:43
 "Stars" – 3:50

Personnel
 Łukasz Myszkowski – vocals
 Sebastian Rokicki – guitar
 Michal Pietrasik – bass
 Krzysztof Bentkowski – drums

References

External links
 Official Antigama Myspace
 Official Relapse Records Antigama website

2007 albums
Antigama albums
Relapse Records albums